Soulicious is the sixth studio album by German singer–songwriter Sarah Connor, released in German-speaking Europe on 30 March 2007 by X-Cell Records. Entirely produced by Kay Denar and Rob Tyger, the album consists of a collection of cover versions of Motown music from the 1960s, 1970s, and 1980s, apart from two original tracks, "Soothe My Soul" and the title track "Soulicious".

Critical reception

AllMusic editor Jon O'Brien found that Soulicious features "faithful renditions of '60s, '70s, and '80s Motown classics." Jochim Gauger from laut.de rated the album two stars out of five.

Track listing

Charts

Weekly charts

Year-end charts

References

2007 albums
Sarah Connor (singer) albums